Hedi Flitz (22 February 1900 – 19 October 1994) was a German politician of the Free Democratic Party (FDP) and former member of the German Bundestag.

Life 
Flitz was a member of the city council of Wilhelmshaven from 1956 to 1976. In the 1961 federal election she was elected to the German Bundestag via the state list of the FDP Lower Saxony, of which she was a member until 1965.

Literature

References

1900 births
1994 deaths
Members of the Bundestag for Lower Saxony
Members of the Bundestag 1961–1965
Female members of the Bundestag
20th-century German women politicians
Members of the Bundestag for the Free Democratic Party (Germany)